Primera División de México (Mexican First Division) Apertura 2004 is a Mexican football tournament - one of two short tournaments that take up the entire year to determine the champion(s) of Mexican football. It began on Saturday, August 14, 2004, and ran until November 20, when the regular season ended. Dorados de Sinaloa was promoted to the México Primera División thus, San Luis, Irapuato and Querétaro were all relegated to the Primera División A, making it 18 teams in the Primera División as opposed to 20. On December 11, UNAM defeated Monterrey and became champions for the fifth time.

Overview

Final standings (groups)

League table

Results

Top goalscorers 
Players sorted first by goals scored, then by last name. Only regular season goals listed.

Source: MedioTiempo

Playoffs

Bracket

Quarterfinals

Monterrey won 3–2 on aggregate.

Atlante won 8–5 on aggregate.

Atlas won 4–3 on aggregate.

UNAM won 4–1 on aggregate.

Semifinals

Monterrey won 7–3 on aggregate.

UNAM won 6–4 on aggregate.

Finals

UNAM won 3–1 on aggregate.

External links
 Mediotiempo.com (where information was obtained)

Mexico
Apertura